Gamaches-en-Vexin (literally Gamaches in Vexin) is a commune in the Eure department in northern France.

Population

See also
Communes of the Eure department

References

External links

Official site

Communes of Eure